Danby Wood is a   Local Nature Reserve on the southern outskirts of Norwich in Norfolk. It is owned and managed by Norwich City Council.

This semi-natural wood on a former chalk mine has many hills, hollows and banks. Broadleaved trees include oaks, limes, sycamores and two walnuts.

There is access from Marston Lane

References

Local Nature Reserves in Norfolk